Free Fall is the debut studio album by the Dixie Dregs, released in 1977. It was their first release on the Capricorn Records label. Three of the songs from this album ("Holiday", "Refried Funky Chicken" and "Wages of Weirdness") are re-recordings from the band's demo release The Great Spectacular (1976).

Track listing
All songs written by Steve Morse.
 "Free Fall" – 4:40
 "Holiday" – 4:29
 "Hand Jig" – 3:16
 "Moe Down" – 3:49
 "Refried Funky Chicken" – 3:16
 "Sleep" – 1:53
 "Cruise Control" – 6:14
 "Cosmopolitan Traveler" – 3:01
 "Dig the Ditch" – 3:50
 "Wages of Weirdness" – 3:45
 "Northern Lights" – 3:12

Personnel 
Steve Morse – guitar, banjo, keyboards, guitar synth
Allen Sloan – strings, violin, viola, electric violin
Andy West – bass guitar
Stephen Davidowski – keyboards
Rod Morgenstein – drums, percussion

References

Dixie Dregs albums
1977 debut albums
Capricorn Records albums
Jazz fusion albums by American artists